Wahlgreniella is a genus of true bugs belonging to the family Aphididae.

The species of this genus are found in Europe and Northern America.

Species:

Wahlgreniella arbuti 
Wahlgreniella empetri 
Wahlgreniella lampeli 
Wahlgreniella nervata 
Wahlgreniella ossiannilssoni 
Wahlgreniella vaccinii 
Wahlgreniella viburni

References

Aphididae
Sternorrhyncha genera